is a Japanese seinen manga artist born in 1956 in Kyoto Prefecture, Japan. Some of his early work was published under the name .  He has been publishing since 1986.

Yui is known for his computer-assisted drawings, manga, and web-images of pretty and sexy girls (bishōjo). He specializes in romantic comedies, sometimes supernatural and often sexually explicit, about these girls and their male and female friends.

Three of his works have been translated into English, Misty Girl Extreme, Hot Tails, and Wingding Orgy.
Writing about Kagome, Kagome, the French manga dictionary Dicomanga pointed to Yui's large usage of computer software which gives a particular yet slightly icy tone to his universe. Also writing about Kagome, Kagome, SplashComics noted that Yui used the technique of using photographs as backgrounds.  Derek Guder, writing about Hot Tails, described Yui as "an adult manga king", enjoying his unique "mix of sex, humor, and bizarre imagination. He simply lets his id run wild, and we get stories that are as surreal as they are sexual".  Guder found the artwork of Hot Tails "still a bit unpolished and busy in these older stories, but his style is undeniable. The art is gorgeous, the ladies are sexy, and the premises too bizarre not to enjoy", giving it a rating of four out of four stars. Yui's Hot Tails has been called the best known exponent of the futanari genre in the West.

Works

As Masaki Katō
  (1986)
  (1986)
  (1988)
  (1989)
  (1990)

As Toshiki Yui
 (1987)
  (1988)
  (1990)
  (1991)
  (1993) (Incorporated into Hot Tails, Vol. 1)
 Kirara (1993–1997)
  (1993–1994)
  (1995)
  (1996)
  (1990) (Incorporated into Hot Tails, Vol. 2)
  (1999)
 Yui Shop (1999–2003) Kodansha
 Re Yui (2000)
  (2000)
 X2 (2000)
 Princess Quest Saga (2000)
  (2000–2001)
  (2002)
  (2003–2005)
  (2004)
  (2006–2008) Kodansha
 H-na (Hな, Perverted, 2008)
 My Sisters (2010)
 Want to Sex (して。。。ほしいの♡ Shite... Hoshii no—lit. I Want to Do It, 2010)
 My Dollhouse (3 volumes, 2010–, status unknown but thought to be either ended or in hiatus)
 Ruri Ruri: Futago no Jijou (るりるり 双子の事情, Ruri Ruri: The Twins' Circumstances, 2012)
 IVNO ユノ (Juno, 2013; IVNO being the Latin spelling)
 あね My Sister+ (2013; a continuation of My Sister, coupled with IVNO ユノ for a tankōbon release)
 Saikin kono sekai wa watashi dake no mono ni narimashita… (最近この世界は私だけのモノになりました… Recently this world became mine only..., 2013–; published in Grand Jump magazine)

Notes

References

External links
 
 Toshiki Yui manga , Masaki Kato manga  at Media Arts Database 

1956 births
Japanese illustrators
Living people
Manga artists from Kyoto Prefecture
Hentai manga artists
Artists from Kyoto